is a railway station in Kashihara, Nara Prefecture, Japan.

Lines
Kintetsu Railway
Osaka Line

Layout
This station has 2 side platforms on the ground, serving a track each.

Adjacent stations

Railway stations in Japan opened in 1925
Railway stations in Nara Prefecture